Takio is a creator-owned comic book series written by Brian Michael Bendis under Marvel Comics' Icon imprint. The title is illustrated by Michael Avon Oeming.

Plot
The series is about two bickering siblings living in an adoptive family; Taki and her younger sister Olivia. When the two girls accidentally gain powers, they decide to become superheroes.

Release
The series debuted as an original graphic novel in 2011. Due to its success, Bendis continued the story in a sequel miniseries in 2012. Bendis stated that his plan was that the title would be continued in yearly miniseries, which would be collected into individual graphic novels; no such miniseries were produced after 2012.

References

Marvel Comics limited series
Comics by Brian Michael Bendis